Leon David Crestohl,  (May 7, 1900 – March 21, 1963) was a Canadian lawyer and politician.

Born in Warsaw, Vistula Land (now Poland), the son of Rabbi Hyman Meyer Crestohl (1865–1928), he emigrated with his family to Canada in 1911 living in Quebec City before moving to Montreal in 1919. Crestohl was educated at McGill University and the Université de Montréal. He was called to the Quebec Bar in 1926 and was made a King's Counsel in 1944. During World War II, he served as Crown Counsel for the Wartime Prices and Trade Board in Montreal.

Crestohl was elected to the House of Commons of Canada for Cartier in a 1950 by-election held after the death of the previous MP, Maurice Hartt. A Liberal, he was re-elected in 1953, 1957, 1958, and 1962, and sat in the house until his death on March 21, 1963.

His great-great-nephew, David de Burgh Graham, was elected in the 2015 Canadian federal election as the Liberal candidate in Laurentides—Labelle.

References

External links
 
 Canadian Jewish Congress Archives
 Guide to the Papers of Leon David Crestohl (1900-1963) at the American Jewish Historical Society, New York.
 Leon David Crestohl fonds at Library and Archives Canada
  Hyman Meyer Crestohl fonds

1900 births
1963 deaths
20th-century Polish Jews
Jewish Canadian politicians
Polish emigrants to Canada
Liberal Party of Canada MPs
McGill University alumni
Members of the House of Commons of Canada from Quebec
Lawyers in Quebec
Université de Montréal alumni
Canadian King's Counsel